Beatysville was an unincorporated community in Jackson County, West Virginia, United States.

References 

Unincorporated communities in West Virginia
Geography of Jackson County, West Virginia